The Neanderthal Museum is a museum in Mettmann, Germany. It was established in 1996. Located at the site of the first Neanderthal man discovery in the Neandertal, it features an exhibit centered on human evolution. The museum was constructed in 1996 to a design by the architects Zamp Kelp, Julius Krauss and Arno Brandlhuber and draws about 170,000 visitors per year. The museum also includes an archaeological park on the original discovery site, a Stone Age workshop, as well as an art trail named "human traces". All signs in the museum as well as the audio guide offered by the museum are available in German and English.

History

The architectural plan for the museum was chosen through a competition held in the spring of 1993 in which 130 participants from Germany and other countries participated. The design submitted by Professor Günter Zamp Kelp, Julius Krauss and Arno Brandlhuber was chosen as it represented the importance of the location. The museum was established on 10 October 1996 near the site where the renowned Neanderthal fossil was found. Its multimedia exhibition was upgraded in 2006. Continuing donations, endowment or testamentary of funding are helpful for further development of the museum and for acquisition of many more exhibits.
The former hotel Neanderthaler Hof was demolished to make room for the museum's extension.

Exhibits
The museum gives a background of the migration of people from the savannas to the modern cities with emphasis of Neanderthals. Their life size models are cast and exhibited on the basis of fossils excavated from archaeological sites. The exhibits are displayed in the four floors of the building which are interconnected through a spiraling ramp. At the beginning of the ramp, in the first section, there are exhibits on the history of the Neanderthal named "A valley and its Secret", which provides information on relics of the skeleton of the Neanderthal. The next exhibit, “A journey through time”, is about crucial stages of human history. Based on the main subject "Evolution of Humankind", the thematic areas spread over five sections exhibit sequentially the "Life and Survival", "Tools and Knowledge", "Myth and Religion", Environment and Nourishment" and "Communication and Society".

The museum has a unique collection of casts of the original human fossils which represent the evolution of the hominids in general and that of the Neanderthals in particular. This cast collection, prepared on the basis of finds from various excavated sites in the world, was facilitated by the donations given by Alfred Krupp von Bohlen und Halbach Foundation.

The museum also houses the NESPOS Society e.V. (Pleistocene People and Places) which provides an interactive database on all anthropological and archaeological data connected with the Neanderthals in the form of "3D–images of CT-Scans and surface scans, as well as high-resolution photographs of human fossils and artifacts”. Software, developed digitally by NESPOS on the basis of all fossil collections, is distributed freely, which includes scans of 600 fossils and artifacts from Belgium, Croatia, France and Germany.

Special exhibitions

The museum houses special exhibitions. The last exhibition on monkeys finished in October 2012 was developed by the museum at a cost of €120,000. A total of 43,000 visitors saw this exhibition, which makes it one of the more popular ones, and it will next be able to be seen at the Naturhistorisches Museum in Braunschweig. The next special exhibition at the Neanderthal Museum will feature wolves and was created by the Görlitz branch of the Naturmuseum Senckenberg; it will open on 18 November 2012 and will be on display until 17 March 2013. Over the course of this exhibition, dog owners are allowed to take their dogs into the museum on four days; this initiative is based on the precedent by the Phaeno Science Center in Wolfsburg that has an annual dog day.

Services

Research
The Neanderthal Museum Foundation, apart from its present exhibits, also supports research with an interdisciplinary academic approach with particular emphasis on research of the early history of humanity. International excavations and research projects are also actively pursued programmes. The museum encourages lay people to facilitate investigations on local prehistory. The Museum has the world's largest database on glacial archaeology, under the title "NESPOS". Its activities include holding international conferences and symposiums on a regular basis, which "generate interdisciplinary contacts and spark new ideas and perspectives" and the proceedings of which are published in scientific series published by the museum. The museum's work in archaeological and palaeo-anthropological research is succinctly displayed through the audio visuals screened with the aid of several types of multimedia equipment. The museum has an exhaustive collection of scientific publications and movies related to the prehistory of Europe and western Asia and also many scientific journals and monographs which can referred at the media centre.

Education programmes
The museum specifically operates a programme to disseminate knowledge to teachers (including pre-school teachers) through its Permanent Exhibition and Stone Age Workshop. Children are also encouraged to learn from the exhibits which are not part of the school curriculum. In this regard the display areas in the garden such as the Discovery Site, the “Human Traces” art trail and the Ice Age Game Reserve are very topical for children in particular. The Neanderthal Museum also conducts a workshop on the Stone Age, which is educative not only to children but also to the youth and older people. In this workshop, access is provided to prehistoric fossils like bone, leather or sinew, prehistoric tools and techniques used in the daily life of our ancestors.

Grounds
In the garden area, which is developed in the precincts of the museum to represent the Neander Valley, there are many attractions along the labelled paths labelled such as Art trail "Human Traces”. Further, towards the Game reserve, the aurochs and the wild horses can be seen. The original excavated site where fossils of Neanderthal man were found is also close to the museum.

Awards
The museum has received many appreciation medals for architecture, exhibits, its website and tourism, between 1997 and 2009, and these are:
 European Museum of the Year Award Special Commendation 1998, by the European Museums Forum
 “Goldstar-Award” in 1999 for the Website by the International Council of Museums; Rheinland Award 2000 for innovative tourism management in the Rhineland
  (current architecture in Germany - a reflexive modern way) by a national and international committee for the special exhibition in 2002
 Special award of the Neanderthal Museum, in 2003, for the best concept of life and presentation of culture by the Foundation "Lebendige Stadt"
 Selected place in the "country of ideas" in 2006, by the initiative "Deutschland - Land der Ideen" (Germany - country of ideas)
 Selected place in the "country of ideas", in 2009, by the initiative "Deutschland - Land der Ideen" (Germany - country of ideas).

References

External links

Ice Age Europe

Museums in North Rhine-Westphalia
Archaeological museums in Germany
Archaeological parks
Neanderthals
Fossil museums
Paleontology in Germany